Wollacott is a surname. Notable people with the surname include:

 Bertie Wollacott (1890–1945), Australian rules footballer
 Joe Wollacott (born 1996), English footballer

See also
 Woolacott, surname
 Woollacott, surname